Delhi Safari (also known as Jungle Safari) is a 2012 Indian computer-animated musical comedy film written and directed by Nikkhil Advani. The film traces the journey of five animals from Mumbai to Delhi as they struggle against an oppressive regime. It has been produced by Krayon Pictures (a Pune-based 3D animation studio). Based on a story and concept by Advani, the film's Hindi-language version features the voices of Akshaye Khanna, Govinda, Suniel Shetty, Boman Irani and Urmila Matondkar. The screenplay of the film is written by Girish Dhamija and Suresh Nair. The music of the film is composed by Shankar–Ehsaan–Loy, while the lyrics are penned by Sameer. It is India's first stereoscopic 3D animation feature film. The film released in India on 19 October 2012. Delhi Safari has been granted exemption from entertainment tax in the states of Maharashtra and Delhi. At the 60th National Film Awards, it won the National Film Award for Best Animated Film. The English-language version of the film has voices by Tom Kenny, Carlos Alazraqui, Jason Alexander, Cary Elwes, Tara Strong, Christopher Lloyd, Jane Lynch, Vanessa Williams and Brad Garrett. The international sales of the film is being handled by Fantastic Films International. The film was released in the United States on 7 December 2012.

Plot
The film starts with Yuvraj (or 'Yuvi', for short) saying that he lost his father, Sultan in the morning, but doesn't want to lose his home at any cost. The film carries a flashback of the morning with Yuvi and Sultan playing in the forest and Sultan teaching self-defence to Yuvi while his mother, Begum, enters. The two mock her for her overly caring attitude towards son that gets her angry and she leaves. Soon, Begum forgives Sultan and Yuvraj. However, while coming back, a whole pack of bulldozers come from nowhere and proceed to demolish the surrounding jungle. Begum manages to escape, but Yuvi and Sultan are trapped. The two land at a site in the forest where they see all the trees missing. In a bid to save Yuvi, Sultan catches Yuvi in his mouth and tosses him to Begum. However, he himself is killed by a human wielding a shotgun, making the whole forest a large enemy of the humans. A talk happens with attendants of all the animals in the area. Many believe that leaving their homes is the only way to survive; however, Bajrangi, a monkey, says that he would beat out the wits of those men with his so-called "vanarsena" - Marela and Bharela, but Bagga the bear advises him to talk to humans and Bajrangi asks whether there is anyone who knows the language of humans. A white bird, seemingly a pigeon, Hawa Hawaai pipes up, saying he knows someone who knows both animal and human languages. Yuvi meets the white bird the next day, and asks who is the one he said about. The white bird says the animal he spoke of is Alex, a parrot who lives with a director, Vikram Khosla. Bajrangi, his "army" of two monkeys, Hawa Hawaai, Bagga, and Yuvi go and kidnap the parrot and convince him to go to Delhi with them to talk to the parliament and save their land. Initially refusing, Alex agrees to go to Delhi. Begum, Bagga, Bajrangi, and his army board a train to Delhi from Mumbai. Yuvi joins them after some time. They then reach Gujarat with guidance from Raju, a bat. In Gujarat, they meet flamingos and a couple who gives them shelter in their homes. One of the flamingos strictly advises them not to cross the banyan tree to avoid the wolf Kaalia and his gang. However, Bajrangi goes there and ties Alex for Kaalia to kill him so that no one can doubt him. Yuvi spots Bajrangi and confronts him but they are spotted by Kaalia. Begum arrives in time to save them.

After this incident, Alex pretends to have lost his voice. The animals consult a doctor who prescribes some ayurvedic medicines to recover Alex's voice, claiming that he has hypertension, stress, and high blood pressure. Bajrangi wholeheartedly does the hard work, sometimes getting injured. One day, he discovers that Alex was just pretending and chases him, inadvertently hitting a beehive. All the animals run with bees chasing them. A thrilling experience of trains follows after Bajrangi tells Alex how guilty he feels of thinking to kill him. Alex also realizes how selfish he was and decides to help he animals. Begum tells that no one is going to Delhi after listening to a tiger's story of how he only survived death at a human's hands by being a coward and forsaking his old ways; thankfully, following a pep talk and seeing Sultan's spirit and Yuvi who inspires them, Begum changes her mind and with renewed hope, proceeds to Delhi. They finally reach Delhi and tell their message through Alex to the Prime Minister of the country that they want peace between humans and animals and how Yuvi inspired all of them to go to Delhi despite all the incidents. In the last scene, it is shown the jungle is saved courtesy of a shared land act (with the area being called the "Sanjay Gandhi National Park-Borivali") and all are happy and settled. The film ends with all animals settled in the Jungle with Yuvi seeing his father's spirit and Begum happy.

Cast

Hindi Version 
 Govinda as Bajrangi the Monkey 
 Akshaye Khanna as Alex the Parrot 
 Boman Irani as Bagga the Bear
 Urmila Matondkar as the Begum the Mother Leopard 
 Suniel Shetty as Sultan the Leopard 
 Swini Khara as Yuvraj the Cub Leopard
 Prem Chopra as Kaalia the hyena
 Deepak Dobriyal as Hawa Hawai the pigeon
 Sanjay Mishra as Marela 
 Saurabh Shukla as Bharela
 Rajesh Kava as Male Flamingo, hyena cook, and Raju Guide
 Akhil Mishra as the tiger

English Version
 Carlos Alazraqui as Bajrangi the Monkey
 Tom Kenny as Alex the Parrot
 Brad Garrett as Bagga the Bear
 Vanessa Williams as Begum the Mother Leopard
 Cary Elwes as Bee Commander/Sultan the Father Leopard 
 Tara Strong as Yuvi the Leopard Cub
 Jason Alexander as Male Flamingo/Hyena Cook  
 Christopher Lloyd as Pigeon
 Jane Lynch as Female Flamingo 
 Brian George as Bat 
 Roger Craig Smith as Bharela/Marela
 JB Blanc as The Director/Prime Minister 
 Dave Wittenberg as Kalia the Hyena Leader
 Troy Baker as Tiger 
 GK Bowes as News Reporter #1
 Kate Higgins as Antelope 
 Lex Lang as Hyena #1 / News Reporter #2 
 Joe Ochman as Man / News Reporter #3 
 Fred Tatasciore as Hyena #2 
 Travis Willingham as Man in Shades

Release
Delhi Safari had its world premiere at Annecy International Animation Film Festival in June 2012. It was theatrically released in India on 19 October 2012.

Reception

Critical response
  Times of India gave Delhi Safari 3 stars, writing ″With satire, spoof, humour and wit, director, Nikhil Advani has highlighted the ongoing aadmi v/s animal battle, the desperate need for preservation of wildlife and the downside of deforestation. His creatures entertain and tell the story in true Bollywood style (too many songs and too much drama ‘foxes’ the plot). The problem is, he doesn’t cut to the chase, and it turns out to be more like a long safar than a safari. The 3D effects are striking in parts and amongst the best we’ve seen in India, but few scenes are déjà vu ‘Lion King’. Alex and Bajrangi with their histrionics and rip-‘roaring’ banter are the stars of this show. While the cartoon creatures will appeal to kids, there’s more for adults here. The ‘real’ Men of the jungle that is. So, Hakuna Matata, go watch it once. And take your cubs along.″ Rohit Khilnani of rediff gave it 3.5 stars, calling it ″a must watch″. He further wrote ″Despite the predictable song-and-dance and even the story, Delhi Safari works as the train journey from Mumbai to New Delhi has a few of stops and fun moments that fit well into the plot.″ It was awarded National Film Award for Best Animated Film at the 60th National Film Awards with a citation "Animation and animal kingdom come together in showcasing the enormous significance of harmonious cohabitation of humans and nature. State-of the-Art Indian technology employed in this film should make us proud!".

Conversely, Miriam Bale of New York Daily News gave a negative review calling the film ″without wit and, sadly, entirely forgettable.″ Neil Genzlinger of The New York Times called the film ″shameless rip off much better animated movies″, he further wrote ″This film is supposed to represent a step forward for Indian animation. The trouble is, there’s not an original idea in it.″

Box office
The film grossed  during its entire run in india. In the United States, it grossed $4,334 in 20 screens in its first weekend. The film was released in South Korea in 2013 where it grossed US$1.83 million and China in 2014 where its lifetime collection is US$1.27 million

Accolades
Delhi Safari qualified for the 2012 Oscars, and was listed in the "reminder list" for Best Picture, Best Animated Feature and Original Score.

Soundtrack

Hindi

English

The title track was among shortlisted 75 songs which were contender for nominations in the Original Song category for the 85th Academy Awards.

Sequel
Krayon Pictures announced a sequel Beijing Safari which they will co-produce with Chinese production house Heshan Media.Tab Murphy will write the film and Daniel St. Pierre is set to direct the film. This will be an English language film with budget around $20 million

See also
List of Indian animated feature films

References

External links
 
 
 Official Facebook Page
 

2010s Hindi-language films
Indian animated films
Indian 3D films
Indian musical comedy-drama films
Animated adventure films
Animated comedy films
Animated musical films
Animated films about bears
Animated films about birds
Animated films about cats
Animated films about monkeys
Mockbuster films
2012 films
2012 computer-animated films
2010s adventure comedy films
2010s musical comedy-drama films
Films set in Mumbai
Films set in Delhi
Environmental films
Best Animated Feature Film National Film Award winners
Films directed by Nikkhil Advani
Indian children's films
2012 comedy films
2012 drama films
Animated films about animals
Animated films about insects
Animated films about apes